La Bohème (aka: La vie de Bohème) is a 1916 American silent historical film directed by Albert Capellani and distributed by World Pictures. The star of this version is Alice Brady, whose father William A. Brady was the founder of World Pictures. This film is one of many silent versions, actually the third or fourth. Later silent versions appeared in 1917 and 1926 starring Lillian Gish. Director Albert Capellani's brother, Paul Capellani, who appears in this film, had made his own short version in 1912.

Cast
Alice Brady as Mimi
Paul Capellani as Rudolphe
June Elvidge as Madame de Rouvre
Leslie Stowe as Durandin
Chester Barnett as Marcel
Zena Keefe as Musette
Frederick Truesdell as Author (credited as Frederick C. Truesdell)
D. J. Flanagan as Schaunard

unbilled
Juliette Clarens

Preservation
A print of La Bohème survives at George Eastman House Motion Picture Collection. This film only survived because MGM purchased it for rights purposes to remake the story with Lillian Gish in 1926.

References

External links

1910s historical romance films
1916 films
American silent feature films
Films based on La bohème
Films directed by Albert Capellani
American black-and-white films
World Film Company films
American historical romance films
1910s American films
1910s English-language films
Silent historical romance films